Cerfontaine Airfield  is a private airfield located near Cerfontaine, Namur, Wallonia, Belgium. It took over most flying activity from the nearby Froidchapelle airfield when that closed.

See also
 List of airports in Belgium

References

External links 
 Airport record for Cerfontaine Airport at Landings.com

Airports in Namur (province)
Airports established in 1990
1990 establishments in Belgium